German (Dürk) is a nickname for a wild or unruly person. 
Durk is a masculine given name. Notable people with the name include:

 Durk Jager (born 1943), American businessman
 Durk Pearson (born 1943), American writer
 Durk Willems (died 1569), Dutch Anabaptist martyr
 Lil Durk (real name Durk Banks; born 1992), American rapper

References

Masculine given names